Alfred Henry "Cap" Fear (June 11, 1901 – February 12, 1978) was a star football player in  the Canadian Football League for seven seasons for the Toronto Argonauts. He was inducted into the Canadian Football Hall of Fame in 1967 and into the Canada's Sports Hall of Fame in 1975.

References
 Canada's Sports Hall of Fame profile

External links
 

1901 births
1978 deaths
Players of Canadian football from Ontario
English players of Canadian football
Toronto Argonauts players
Hamilton Tigers football players
Canadian Football Hall of Fame inductees
English emigrants to Canada